Elisabeth Röhl; née Elisabeth Gohlke ( 22 August 1888 – 21 September 1930) was one of the first German women politicians.

Her second marriage was to the fellow politician Emil Kirschmann, as a result of which sources after 1922 generally identify her as Elisabeth Kirschmann-Röhl.

Life and politics
Elisabeth Röhl was born in Landsberg an der Warthe, the daughter of a carpenter called Theodor Gohlke and his wife Henriette.  Her elder sister was Marie Juchacz.  Their childhood was marked by rural poverty.

After successful completion of her education at the local school Röhl undertook an apprenticeship in dressmaking.   She was active in the Association of Tailors and Dressmakers.   During the First World War, Elisabeth Röhl worked, together with Anna Maria Schulte, Else Meerfeld and her sister, Marie Juchacz, with the "Home Work Centre" (Heimarbeitszentrale).   This involved setting up sewing centres to give women the opportunity to work from home, along with other support for war widows and orphans.   She was also a member of the so-called Food Commission (Lebensmittelkommission) which set up and operated soup kitchens.

On 6 February 1919 Elisabeth Röhl and her sister were two of the 36 women elected to the Weimar National Assembly. The national election, which had taken place on 19 January 1919 had been the first in Germany in which women had been entitled to vote.   On 16 July 1919 she spoke in the National assembly to demand the equalisation of the status and rights of illegitimate with those of legitimate children, and equivalent demands in respect of unmarried and married mothers.

She is quoted on the cover of E.D. Morel's Black Horror on the Rhine from a speech she made in the Reichstag: "We appeal to the women of the world to support us in our protest
against the utterly unnatural occupation by coloured troops of German districts along the Rhine.''

Unlike her sister, Elisabeth was not re-elected to what had now become the Reichstag at the next election, in June 1920.   Between 1921 and her death she sat as a member of the Prussian Landtag (regional parliament). She died in Düsseldorf.

Family
Elisabeth Röhl was twice married and had a son by her first marriage. She married secondly, in 1922, Emil Kirschmann who was a member of the national Reichstag between 1924 and 1933.

 
Elisabeth's sister, Marie Juchacz, was devastated by Elisabeth's unexpected death.

"...the constant comradeship with Elisabeth [was] the most powerful force in my life"
Marie Juchacz

 “...das ständige kameradschaftliche Zusammensein mit Elisabeth [war] die am stärksten wirkende Kraft in meinem Leben.”
Marie Juchacz 
Elisabeth's sister, more than nine years her senior, was Marie Juchacz. They lived together in Berlin after moving there from the countryside in 1908 and when work commitments required Maria to relocate to Cologne her children stayed behind to be looked after by their aunt, Elisabeth. A couple of years later it was Elisabeth who relocated, in order to join her sister in Cologne. The sisters were also closely aligned politically, and worked together on several political books during the 1920s.  According to one source, following Elisabeth's death, which came suddenly and unexpectedly in 1930, her sister and widower married one another.

See also 
 Feminism

References

1888 births
1930 deaths
People from Gorzów Wielkopolski
People from the Province of Brandenburg
German Protestants
Social Democratic Party of Germany politicians
Members of the Reichstag of the Weimar Republic
20th-century German women politicians
German activists
German women activists
German socialist feminists